The FA Coaching Diploma is coaching certification accredited by the Football Association (FA) in England. The FA recognises the diploma as being equivalent to the UEFA Pro Licence.

References

Football in England
Coaching diploma